The 1987 European Ladies' Team Championship took place 8–12 July at Turnberry Golf Resort in South Ayrshire, Scotland, United Kingdom. It was the 15th women's golf amateur European Ladies' Team Championship.

Venue 

The Ailsa Course, situated 80 kilometres south of Glasgow, Scotland, on headland along the Firth of Clyde, overlooking the Isle of Arran and Ailsa Craig, was initially opened with 13 holes in 1901, designed by Willie Fernie, and later completed to 18 holes. It was redesigned by Mackenzie Ross between 1949 and 1951. 

The course had previously hosted The Open Championship twice; 1977 and 1986.

The championship course was set up with par 73.

On the first day of competition, it was blowing strong winds on the course. The second day it was warm and windless. The third day, when the quarterfinals was intended to take place, heavy rain caused play to be postponed to the day after.

Format 
All participating teams played two qualification rounds of stroke-play with six players, counted the five best scores for each team.

The eight best teams formed flight A, in knock-out match-play over the next three days. The teams were seeded based on their positions after the stroke-play. The first placed team was drawn to play the quarter final against the eight placed team, the second against the seventh, the third against the sixth and the fourth against the fifth.

In each match between two nation teams, two 18-hole foursome games and five 18-hole single games were to be played. Because of delay of play, due to bad weather, quarter finals and semi finals were played on the same day, without foursome games and only with five single games.

Teams were allowed to switch players during the team matches, selecting other players in to the afternoon single games after the morning foursome games. If a game was all square after 18 holes, it was declared halved, if the team match was already decided.

The five teams placed 9–13 in the qualification stroke-play formed Flight B, to meet each other over three rounds to decide their final positions.

Teams 
13 nation teams contested the event. Each team consisted of six players.

Players in the leading teams

Other participating teams

Winners 
Host nation Scotland and team France tied the lead at the opening 36-hole qualifying competition, each with a score of 26 over par 756, with Scotland winning by the tie-breaking better total non-counting scores. 

Individual leader in the 36-hole stroke-play competition was Sofia Grönberg, Sweden, with a score of 1-under-par 145, one stroke ahead of Shirley Lawson, Scotland and Vicki Thomas, Wales. This was the fourth time in a row, and fifth time in the last seven championships, a Swedish player had won or tied the win in the individual competition, achieved by five different players.

Team Sweden won the gold, earning their second title, beating team Wales in the final 6–1. Team Spain earned third place, beating Scotland 5–2 in the bronze match.

Results 
Qualification round

Team standings

* Note: In the event of a tie the order was determined by the better non-counting score.

Individual leaders

 Note: There was no official award for the lowest individual score.

Flight A

Bracket

* Note: The quarter finals were delayed due to bad weather and played on the same day as the semi finals, why five single games and no foursome games were played in the matches on that day.

Final games

Match for 5th place

Match for 7th place

Flight B

First round *

* Note: The first round was delayed due to bad weather and played on the same day as the second round, why five single games and no foursome games were played in the matches on that day.

Second round *

Third round

Final standings

See also 
 Espirito Santo Trophy – biennial world amateur team golf championship for women organized by the International Golf Federation.
 European Amateur Team Championship – European amateur team golf championship for men organised by the European Golf Association.

References

External links 
 European Golf Association: Results

European Ladies' Team Championship
Golf tournaments in Scotland
European Ladies' Team Championship
European Ladies' Team Championship
European Ladies' Team Championship